Kollhøin is a mountain in Vågå Municipality in Innlandet county, Norway. The mountain is surrounded by several other notable mountains including Nautgardstinden to the northeast, Styggehøi to the northwest, Surtningssue to the west, Gloptinden to the southwest, Besshø to the south, and Besseggen and Veslfjellet to the southeast.

See also
List of mountains of Norway by height

References

Jotunheimen
Vågå
Mountains of Innlandet